Helen Resor may refer to:

Helen Lansdowne Resor (1886–1964), American advertising executive
Helen Resor (ice hockey) (born 1985), American Olympic ice hockey athlete